John Hardin McHenry (October 13, 1797 – November 1, 1871) was a U.S. Representative from Kentucky, father of Henry Davis McHenry.

Biography 
Born near Ballymena County, Ireland, McHenry was tutored privately. He studied law.

He was admitted to the bar in 1818 and commenced practice in Leitchfield, Kentucky. He was appointed postmaster of Leitchfield October 8, 1819. In 1821, he served as a major of the Eighty-seventh Regiment of Kentucky Militia, in 1821. He was appointed Commonwealth attorney by Governor John Adair in 1822. He moved to Hartford, Kentucky in 1823. He was appointed Commonwealth attorney by Governor Thomas Metcalfe in 1831 and again by Governor James Turner Morehead in 1837. 
He was commissioned a colonel in the State militia in 1837. He served as member of the Kentucky House of Representatives from Ohio County, Kentucky in 1840. He was an unsuccessful Whig candidate for election in 1840 to the Twenty-seventh Congress. He was appointed on the board of the Transylvania University in 1843.

Mchenry was elected as a Whig to the Twenty-ninth Congress (March 4, 1845 – March 3, 1847). He was nominated for reelection in 1846, but withdrew his name on the eve of election. He resumed the practice of law.

He served as member of the State constitutional convention in 1849 and served as chairman. He moved to Owensboro, Kentucky in 1854, and served as judge of the circuit court of several counties in 1854. He died in Owensboro, Kentucky, on November 1, 1871. He was interred in Rosehill Elmwood Cemetery.

References

1797 births
1871 deaths
Kentucky lawyers
Members of the Kentucky House of Representatives
People from Washington County, Kentucky
American militia officers
Whig Party members of the United States House of Representatives from Kentucky
19th-century American politicians
People from Leitchfield, Kentucky
Politicians from Owensboro, Kentucky
People from Hartford, Kentucky
19th-century American lawyers